Mikhail Nikolaevich Berulava (Russian: Михаил Николаевич Берулава; born August 3, 1950, Sukhumi, Abkhaz ASSR) — Russian scientist and politician. Deputy of the State Duma of Russia, member of the KPRF faction, Deputy Chairman of the Committee on Education. Doctor of pedagogical sciences, professor, academician of the Russian Academy of Education. Member of the Presidium of the Russian Academy of Education.

Awards
Order of Friendship (March 11, 2008)

Some publications
«Basics of Modern Education» (North American University Press, 2008., 117 p.)

External links
 The Voice of Russia article on Sochi Olympics preparation

1950 births
Living people
People from Sukhumi
Russian educational theorists
Academicians of the Russian Academy of Education
Sixth convocation members of the State Duma (Russian Federation)
Seventh convocation members of the State Duma (Russian Federation)
Eighth convocation members of the State Duma (Russian Federation)
Communist Party of the Russian Federation members